Christian Overby (born 23 August 1985) is a Danish professional football midfielder who plays as a midfielder.

Career

Later career

References

External links

1985 births
Living people
Danish men's footballers
Association football midfielders
FC Midtjylland players
Viborg FF players
Hobro IK players
Jammerbugt FC players
Vendsyssel FF players
HB Køge players
Dalum IF players
Danish Superliga players
Danish 1st Division players